Tariq Ata (1943 – 24 July 1989) was a Pakistani cricket umpire. He stood in one Test match, Pakistan vs. Australia, in 1988 and six ODI games between 1982 and 1988.

See also
 List of Test cricket umpires
 List of One Day International cricket umpires

References

1943 births
1989 deaths
Place of birth missing
Pakistani Test cricket umpires
Pakistani One Day International cricket umpires